is the second "best of" compilation from the Japanese female idol group Morning Musume and it was released March 31, 2004, selling a total of 180,897 copies. It contains ten of the A-sides released since the release of Best! Morning Musume 1 in 2002, including several cuts not previously available on any other Morning Musume album; one new song and one popular song from a single.

The album was certified Gold by the Recording Industry Association of Japan for physical sales.

Best! Morning Musume 2 would be the last full-length CD release to feature Natsumi Abe, who graduated from the group earlier in the year. Also, unlike the first singles compilation, graduated members Abe, Maki Goto and Kei Yasuda are all represented both on the cover and in the liner notes. The album comes with a large badge and comes in a special package.

Track listing 
 
 "Do It! Now"
 
 
 
 
 
 
 "As for One Day"

References

External links 
  Best! Morning Musume 2 entry at Up-Front Works

Morning Musume compilation albums
2004 greatest hits albums
Zetima compilation albums